The Easy Way or Easy Way may refer to:
 The Easy Way (film), a 2008 French heist film
 The Easy Way (Jimmy Giuffre album)
 The Easy Way (Eddy Arnold album)
 Easyway, a Portuguese punk rock band
 EasyWay, an international tea outlet
 Easy Way (song), a song by Deborah Cox
 Easy Way, a 2005 four-issue comic book limited series published by IDW Publishing
 Easyway, a program and series of books by Allen Carr.
 "The Easy Way", a song by Westlife from the 2007 album Back Home